John Murphy (23 March 1894 – November 1921) was a Scottish footballer who played as an inside forward. He established himself at Hamilton Academical, playing regularly for Accies through the World War I years (unlike most competitions, the Scottish Football League's top division continued to operate in an official capacity) and winning a Lanarkshire Cup in 1920 just before moving to England with Bury. A year later he signed for Rotherham County, but died from tuberculosis in November 1921.

References

1894 births
1921 deaths
Date of death unknown
Footballers from Airdrie, North Lanarkshire
Scottish footballers
Association football inside forwards
Scottish Junior Football Association players
Ashfield F.C. players
Hamilton Academical F.C. players
Airdrieonians F.C. (1878) players
Bury F.C. players
Rotherham County F.C. players
Scottish Football League players
English Football League players
Tuberculosis deaths in England
20th-century deaths from tuberculosis